Västerviks-Tidningen is a Swedish daily newspaper based in Västervik.

History and profile
Västerviks-Tidningen was established in 1834. Its chief editor is Charly Nilsson. The paper is a part of the Norrköping Tidningar Media AB which also owns Norrköpings Tidningar. The publisher of Västerviks-Tidningen has been Pressgrannar AB since January 2012.

Västerviks-Tidningen has its headquarters in Västervik.

References

External links
 Official Homepage (Swedish)

1834 establishments in Sweden
Publications established in 1834
Daily newspapers published in Sweden
Swedish-language newspapers
Mass media in Västervik